Katia Follesa (born 12 January 1976 in Giussano) and Valeria Graci (born 22 August 1980 in Milan) are an Italian former comedy duo who worked on stage, films and television as Katia & Valeria.
 
The couple formed in 2001 in a drama school, the Laboratorio Scaldasole in Milan. The duo had its breakout in 2004, when they became regular in the variety shows Colorado Cafè (broadcast on Italia 1), Sformat (Rai 2) and Comedy Lab (MTV). In 2006 they entered in the cast on the Canale 5 show Zelig, and in 2007 they co-hosted the practical joke reality television series Scherzi a parte.

In 2012 the couple split in order to pursue solo projects.

References

External links 
 
 

Italian film actresses
Italian stage actresses
Italian television personalities
Italian comedians
Italian comedy duos
Year of birth missing (living people)